Major Hayman Rooke (20 February 1723 – 18 September 1806) was a British soldier and antiquarian who became an antiquary on his retirement from the Army. The Major Oak is named after him.

Biography
Rooke was born on 20 February 1723 and baptised at St Martin-in-the-Fields in Westminster on 19 March of the same year.  After a modest military career, in which he achieved the rank of major in the 30th Regiment of Foot, Hayman Rooke retired to Mansfield Woodhouse in Nottinghamshire and turned himself into an antiquary. He is particularly associated with Roman finds around Mansfield Woodhouse, but he was a pioneer archaeologist within the county of Nottinghamshire. Despite having no formal training, he was well versed in a range of archaeological fields, and a frequent contributor to the journal Archaeologia between 1776 and 1796. He wrote about the Romans as well as writing about medieval churches and local great estates such as Welbeck, Bolsover, Haddon Hall and Thoresby. Rooke died on 18 September 1806 and is buried in the chancel of the Church of St Edmund, Mansfield Woodhouse.

The Major Oak is named in his honour and in recognition of his writings and love of Sherwood Forest.

Rooke was a magistrate and deputy Lieutenant for Nottinghamshire. His former residence, Woodhouse Place in Mansfield Woodhouse received a blue plaque in 2015 .

References

External links

 Hayman Rooke and Major Oak Day

1723 births
1806 deaths
18th-century English people
People from Westminster
English antiquarians
30th Regiment of Foot officers
People from Mansfield Woodhouse